The basketball tournament at the 1971 Mediterranean Games was held in Izmir, Turkey.

Medalists

References
1971 Competition Medalists

Basketball
Basketball at the Mediterranean Games
International basketball competitions hosted by Turkey
1971–72 in European basketball
1971 in Asian basketball
1971 in African basketball